Kamala Panta  is a Nepali politician belonging to Nepali Congress. She is also member of Rastriya Sabha and was elected under women's category.

References 

Living people
Nepali Congress politicians from Gandaki Province
21st-century Nepalese politicians
Year of birth missing (living people)
Members of the National Assembly (Nepal)
Nepal MPs 1999–2002
Nepal MPs 1994–1999
Members of the 1st Nepalese Constituent Assembly
Members of the 2nd Nepalese Constituent Assembly